Khánh Hòa may refer to several places in Vietnam, including:

Khánh Hòa Province
Khánh Hòa, Sóc Trăng, a ward of Vĩnh Châu
Khánh Hòa, An Giang, a commune of Châu Phú District
Khánh Hòa, Yên Bái, a commune of Lục Yên District
Khánh Hòa, Cà Mau, a commune of U Minh District
Khánh Hòa, Ninh Bình, a commune of Yên Khánh District